Dulovo Municipality is a municipality (obshtina) in Silistra Province, Northeastern Bulgaria, located in the Danubian Plain, in the area of the South Dobrudzha geographical region, about 25 km south of Danube river. It is named after its administrative centre – the town of Dulovo.

The municipality embraces a territory of 566.33 km2 with a population of 28,860 inhabitants, as of December 2009.

The main road I-7 crosses the area from north to south, connecting the province centre of Silistra with the city of Shumen and the eastern operating part of Hemus motorway.

Settlements 

Dulovo Municipality includes the following 27 places (towns are shown in bold):

Demography 
The following table shows the change of the population during the last four decades. Since 1992 Dulovo Municipality has comprised the former municipality of Okorsh and the numbers in the table reflect this unification.

Ethnic groups 
Ethnic Turks constitute the majority of the population of Dulovo, followed by Bulgarians and Roma people.

Religious composition 
According to the latest Bulgarian census of 2011, the religious composition, among those who answered the optional question on religious identification, was the following:

Most inhabitants are Muslim, followed by Christians.

Demographic indicators 
The municipality of Dulovo has a relatively good demographic structure compared to other areas in Bulgaria, although the situation is becoming worse.

See also
Provinces of Bulgaria
Municipalities of Bulgaria
List of cities and towns in Bulgaria

References

External links
 Official website 

Municipalities in Silistra Province